VVA may refer to:

Vietnam Veterans of America
Versatile Vehicle Architecture, an automotive design concept
Virtual Virginia, Virginia's online education system
Vulvovaginal atrophy, a symptom of reduced estrogen